COSMAC may refer to:

 The RCA (CDP)1802 microprocessor, aka RCA COSMAC
 The COSMAC ELF an RCA COSMAC microprocessor–based computer released 1976, sold as a kit
 The COSMAC VIP an RCA COSMAC microprocessor–based computer aimed at video games, released 1977, sold as a kit